Hugh Masekela's Latest is the sixth studio album by South African jazz trumpeter Hugh Masekela. It was released in 1967 via Uni Records label.

Track listing

Personnel
Bass (uncredited) – Harold Dotson, Red Mitchell
Congas (uncredited) – Big Black
Cover design – George Whiteman
Drums (uncredited) – Chuck Carter, Mike McGriff
Guitar (uncredited) – Barney Kessel, Roy Gaines
Photography – Jonathan Hayes
Photography (liner) – Peter Whorf
Piano (uncredited) – Charlie Smalls, Hotep Cecil Barnard
Producer – Stewart Levine
Recorded by – Alan Todd, Doc Seigel, Stan Ross
Saxophone (uncredited) – Al Abreu
Trombone (uncredited) – Wayne Henderson
Trumpet (uncredited) – Hugh Masekela
Vibraphone (uncredited) – Emil Richards
Vocals (uncredited) – Hugh Masekela (tracks: 1 2 4 5 9 10)

References

External links

 

1967 albums
Uni Records albums
Hugh Masekela albums
Albums produced by Stewart Levine